The Union of Morrisania (founded 17 July 1855, South Bronx, New York, United States) was a baseball team which played in the National Association of Base Ball Players league.

History 
In their first season, the Union played only one game, against Young America, which Union won 25-8. In the second season, Union played five games. They finished second in the league with a record of 3 wins and 2 losses to the Brooklyn Atlantics who had four wins and no losses. From 1857 (with a record of three wins and two losses) to 1861, Union placed no higher than fifth. In the 1862 season, Union placed fourth with five wins and five losses. This encouraged the team and in the 1865 season, they placed third in the league with thirteen wins and ten losses. At the time, this was a franchise record.

In 1866, for the first time, Union placed first in the league with twenty-five wins and three losses. However, they did not win the premiership title. The following year, Union finished third with twenty-one wins and eight losses, succeeded in the playoffs, and beat the Brooklyn Atlantics to win their first and only premiership title. In 1868, Union finished third with thirty-seven wins and six losses. This was their best number of wins to losses.

In 1869, new professional baseball teams such as the Cincinnati Red Stockings entered the league. Union played only fifteen games, placing fifth with ten losses. In 1870, Union won seven games and lost eighteen games against the professional teams, and won twenty games and lost nineteen games against the rest of the league. After the 1870 season, Union refused to enter the new National Association of Professional Base Ball Players. The National Association of Base Ball Players was dissolved, and two years later, in 1873, the Union team disbanded.

1867 champion team 

On 10 October 1867, Union beat the Brooklyn Atlantics by fourteen runs to thirteen. Although Union had twenty one wins and eight losses in the season, they won the premiership title.

References

External links

Account of an 1862 match
MLB Historian John Thorn on The Unions of Morrisania
Union Club of Morrisania at Protoball

Defunct National Association baseball teams
National Association of Base Ball Players teams
Defunct baseball teams in New York City
Baseball teams established in 1855
1873 disestablishments in New York (state)
1855 establishments in New York (state)
Morrisania, Bronx
Sports in the Bronx
Defunct baseball teams in New York (state)
Baseball teams disestablished in 1873